Mstino is a lake in Tver Oblast, Russia, in the Valdai Hills area. Its main outflow is Msta River. It lies at an altitude of 154 meters, with maximum depth of 10 meters.

References

See also
 Akademicheskaya Dacha, an artist base on the Mstino Lake

Lakes of Tver Oblast